The North Syracuse Central School District (NSCSD) is a public school district in Central New York in the United States. The district is located just outside Syracuse, New York. It serves the communities of North Syracuse, Clay, Cicero, Bridgeport, and Mattydale.

In July 2019, Daniel D. Bowles became the Superintendent of Schools.  Daniel has worked for the district since 1997, first as a school counselor at Cicero-North Syracuse High School, then became associate principal at Gillette Road Middle School, principal at Roxboro Road Elementary School in 2001, then became director of elementary education in 2008 and most recently, as the associate superintendent in 2012.  He replaced Annette Speach as Superintendent of Schools.

The North Syracuse Central School District is the largest of the 23 component school districts in the Onondaga-Cortland-Madison (OCM) Boards of Cooperative Educational Services (BOCES). As a component of the OCM BOCES, NSCSD participates in its career and technical, alternative and special education programs.

Board of education
Current board members are:
Paul Farfaglia, President
Michael A. Mirizio, Vice President
Robert Crabtree
George Harrington
Matthew Hermann
Terri Krueger
Erin McDonald
Mary Scanlon
Mark Thorne
Clay Abear

Connie Gibson is currently the District Clerk

Administrators
Daniel D. Bowles, Superintendent of Schools
Christopher R. Leahey, Associate Superintendent for Teaching and Learning
Donald F.X. Keegan, Associate Superintendent for Business Services
Jason Nephew, Assistant Superintendent for Human Resources

Schools

Pre-Kindergarten
Early Education Program at Main Street School
205 South Main Street; Syracuse, NY 13212
Principal: Dawn Hussein

Elementary (Grades K-4)
Allen Road Elementary
803 Allen Road; Syracuse, NY 13212
Principal: Emily Lafountain
Karl W. Saile Bear Road Elementary
5590 Bear Road; Syracuse, NY 13212
Principal: John Cole
Cicero Elementary
5979 Route 31; Cicero, NY 13039
Principal: Kathleen Wheeler
Lakeshore Road Elementary
7180 Lakeshore Road; Cicero, NY 13039
Principal: Tina Chmielewski
Roxboro Road Elementary
200 Bernard Street; Syracuse, NY 13211
Principal: Matthew Motala
Smith Road Elementary
5959 Smith Road; Syracuse, NY 13212
Principal: Lyndsey Maloney

Middle Schools (Grades 5-7)
Gillette Road Middle
6150 South Bay Road, Cicero, NY 13039
Principal: David P. Cordone
Associate Principal: Shawn Akley
Roxboro Road Middle
300 Bernard Street, Mattydale, NY 13211
Principal: Ashley Carducci (Interim)
Associate Principal: Paula Kopp (Interim)

Junior High (Grades 8-9)
North Syracuse Junior High
5353 West Taft Road, North Syracuse, NY 13212
Principal: Constance L. Turose
Associate Principals:
Chuck Yonko
Kristen Hill

Senior High (Grades 10-12)
Cicero – North Syracuse High School
6002 Route 31, Cicero, NY 13039
Principal: Jamie Sullivan 
House Principals:
Heather Puchta
Sara Kees
Ann Lorenzini

Logo
The District logo was redesigned in 1994. The district held a contest open to the community to design the new district logo. The current logo was designed by then Junior Joseph Byrns (class of 95) in a computer graphics course at Cicero-North Syracuse High School.

References

School districts in New York (state)
Education in Onondaga County, New York
School districts established in 1952